John Warwick Lindley (born November 17, 1951) is an American cinematographer known for his work on such films as Field of Dreams, Bewitched, Pleasantville and You've Got Mail.

Life and career 
Born in New York City, Lindley began his career on several TV movies such as The Gentleman Bandit and Mr. Griffin and Me as well as 12 episodes of the TV series Nurse. Lindley's first major cinematography job was on the 1987 horror film, The Stepfather. He worked on Field of Dreams with Phil Alden Robinson and soon worked on Robinson's other films Sneakers and The Sum of All Fears.

In 1999, his work on Pleasantville was honoured by three nominations from the Satellite Awards and the Online Film Critics Society. In 2012, his Pan Am pilot earned a nomination for Outstanding Achievement in Cinematography in One-Hour Episodic/Pilot Television by the American Society of Cinematographers.

In March 2020, Lindley was elected President of the International Cinematographers Guild. He was succeeded by Baird Steptoe Sr. in May 2022, after Lindley announced he would not be seeking a second term.

Filmography

References

External links 

Official Website

1951 births
American cinematographers
Living people